Override is a Data East vertical-scrolling shooter game released for the PC Engine in 1991. Later that year, Sting Entertainment, the creator of the original Data East game, developed and self-published a version for the X68000 released as Last Battalion.

It is the first recorded game developed by Sting Entertainment and the X68000 version is now available as a free "one stage only" demo download on Sting's website. On September 4, 2007, G-Mode published the Override version of the game for the Wii Virtual Console which (like its 1991 release) was reserved exclusively for the Japanese market.

Gameplay
The player can increase the power of your primary weapon by collecting “P” items. Your ship also has a charge feature, where if you do not touch the fire button for a few seconds, your ship will charge up a powerful shot that can destroy many of the enemies on-screen. You can also acquire secondary weapons by collecting a gem. The gem changes colors, and depending on which color it is when you collect it, you will get a different weapon. You can power up your secondary weapon by collecting another gem of the same color.

Reception
On release, the game was scored a 30 out of 40 by a panel of four reviewers at Famicom Tsūshin.

References

 http://www.paleface.net/cgi-bin/gdb/n.pl?c=474

External links
Official website

1991 video games
Data East video games
X68000 games
Single-player video games
Sting Entertainment games
TurboGrafx-16 games
Vertically scrolling shooters
Video games developed in Japan